Sarah Frances Hardy (born April 28, 1969) is an American artist and author/illustrator, best known for her picture books. Her first book, Puzzled by Pink, was published by Viking Children's Books/Penguin Putnam in 2012.

Biography 

Sarah Frances Hardy is an American author/illustrator of picture books, best known for her debut picture book Puzzled by Pink. Raised in Jackson, Mississippi, Sarah Frances graduated from Davidson College and majored in fine art. During college, she spent two summers at Parsons School of Design in New York City and Paris. After college, she attended the University of Mississippi School of Law and graduated cum laude. Following law school, she worked as a fine artist exhibiting her works in solo and group exhibitions throughout the Southeast and in New York. She switched gears to writing and illustrating children's books to fulfill a lifelong dream of being a published children's author. She currently resides in Oxford, Mississippi.

Works

Books
Puzzled by Pink (2012) Viking Children's Books
Paint Me! (2014) Sky Pony Press
Dress Me! (2015) Sky Pony Press

Paintings
Vivid colors are the hallmarks of Sarah Frances's paintings. Her paintings have been exhibited in numerous galleries throughout the Southeast, including an exhibition at a gallery in Soho. Her work attracts numerous big name buyers. Among her biggest admirers is Steve Wynn, who bought many of Frances's paintings for his resort in Biloxi, Mississippi.

References

External links 

 Author Website
 Puzzled by Pink on Goodreads
 Mundie Kids Review of Puzzled by Pink
 Seven Impossible Things Interview

American women children's writers
Artists from Jackson, Mississippi
American women illustrators
American illustrators
American children's writers
Living people
1969 births
Davidson College alumni
21st-century American women